Most Wanted, Volume 1 is a 1983 role-playing game supplement for Villains and Vigilantes published by Fantasy Games Unlimited.

Plot summary
Most Wanted, Volume 1 is a collection of 30 villains for the Villains & Vigilantes game.

Reception
Steve Crow reviewed Most Wanted, Volume 1 in Space Gamer No. 70. Crow commented that "All in all, this book is a must for any V&V fan.  Champions and Superworld referees might find it interesting for source material, but conversion is necessary.  I consider it the most useful V&V supplement to date."

References

Role-playing game supplements introduced in 1983
Superhero role-playing game supplements
Villains and Vigilantes